The Whatshan Range is a subrange of the Monashee Mountains of the Columbia Mountains in southeastern British Columbia, Canada, located south of South Fosthall Creek.

References

Whatshan Range in the Canadian Mountain Encyclopedia

Monashee Mountains